The Cuckoo Waltz is a British television sitcom produced by Granada Television for the ITV network between 1975 and 1980. It was written by Geoffrey Lancashire, and produced and directed by Bill Gilmour.

The series, which was set in 1970s and early 1980s Manchester, dealt with the comic complications that ensue when impoverished newly-weds Chris and Fliss Hawthorne (David Roper and Diane Keen) take in lodger Gavin Rumsey (Lewis Collins) to ease their financial problems. Collins left after three series and was replaced by Ian Saynor as Adrian Lockett in the fourth series.

The series was re-screened by now defunct Satellite TV channel Granada Plus in the late 1990s and early to mid-2000s.

Cast
Diane Keen as Fliss Hawthorne
David Roper as Chris Hawthorne
Lewis Collins as Gavin Rumsey (series 1-3)
Clare Kelly as Connie Wagstaffe
John McKelvey as Austen Tweedale
Ian Saynor as Adrian Lockett (from series 4)

Episodes

Series 1 (1975)
Cuckoo in the Nest (27 October 75)
One Week Later (3 November 75)
Paying Your Way (10 November 75)
The Anniversary (17 November 75)
A Day Off (24 November 75)
Fleet Street (1 December 75)
House for Sale (8 December 75)

Series 2 (1976)
Babysitter (8 July 76)
Financial Difficulties (15 July 76)
The Armchair (22 July 76)
Connie (29 July 76)
The Model (5 August 76)
The Letter (12 August 76)

Series 3 (1977)
It's All Greek to Me (10 January 77)
The Treat (17 January 77)
The Air Hostesses (24 January 77)
The Policeman (31 January 77)
Perspectives (7 February 77)
Alterations (14 February 77)

Series 4 (1980)
The New Lodger (26 June 80)
The Neighbour (3 July 80)
Leather (10 July 80)
A Love That Does Not Dim (17 July 80)
Guess Who's Coming to Dinner? (24 July 80)
The Press Ball (31 July 80)
An Ideal Home (7 August 80)

DVD release
All four series of The Cuckoo Waltz have been released on DVD in 2009 and 2011, and a box set with the complete series to follow.

External links

The Official Lewis Collins Fansite

ITV sitcoms
1970s British sitcoms
1975 British television series debuts
1980 British television series endings
1980s British sitcoms
Television series by ITV Studios
Television shows set in Manchester
English-language television shows
Television shows produced by Granada Television